Sannat is an administrative unit of Malta, on the island of Gozo, with a population of 2,117 people (March 2014). Ta' Sannat is in the south of Gozo, popular for its very high cliffs, ancient cart ruts, temples and dolmens, and rich fauna and flora. In 1951 The Duchess of Edinburgh (who became Queen Elizabeth II) of the United Kingdom visited a house called "The Lace house" located in a small square in Ta' Sannat called "Pjazza Tax-Xelina".

Zones in Sannat
Iċ-Ċnus
Il-Ħofra
Inni Wara 
Mġarr ix-Xini
Ta' Bardan
Ta' Ċenċ 
Ta' Ċenċ Cliffs
Ta' Dun Nastas 
Ta' Durell 
Ta' Marżiena 
Ta' Randu 
Ta' Seguna 
Ta' Żabbetta 
Tax-Xamgħan

Local Council 
The current local council members are:

Vella Philip - Mayor, PL
Mercieca Anthony k/a Toni - Vice-Mayor, PL
Bajjada Gudas Taddeo (Teddy) - PL
Bajada Joseph - PN
Tabone Manuel - PN

Ta' Sannat Main Roads

Pjazza Santa Margarita (St. Margret Square)
Pjazza Tax-Xelina
Triq Dun Xand Aquilina
Triq il-Kbira (Main Street)
Triq ix-Xewkija (Xewkija Road) 
Triq Marziena (Marziena Street) 
Triq Santa Marija (St Mary Street)
Triq Ta' Ċenċ (Ta' Cenc Road)
Triq Ta' Sannat (Ta' Sannat Road) 
Triq Tal-Gruwa (Tal-Gruwa Road)

Other Streets at Ta' Sannat

Daħla Ċnus (Cnus Lane) 
Sqaq Ta' Xamgħan (Xamghan Alley) 
Triq Daħla taċ-Ċnus (Dahla Tac-Cnus Road) 
Triq Dun Lazzru Camilleri (Fr. Lazzarus Camilleri Street)
Triq Dun Xand Aquilina (Fr. Alexander Aquilina Street)
Triq Ta' Gerxija (Gerxija Street)  
Triq il-Blat (Rocks Street) 
Triq il-Falkun (Falcon Street) 
Triq il-Ħarruba (Carob Street) 
Triq il-Kalati (Kalati Street) 
Triq il-Kalkara tal-Ġir (Klin Street) 
Triq il-Misraħ (Square Street) 
Triq il-Pinnur (Wind Direction Street) 
Triq it-28 ta' April, 1688 (28 April 1688 Street)
Triq it-Tempju tal-Imramma (Mramma Temple Street) 
Triq it-Tilliera (Tilliera Street) 
Triq it-Tin (Fig Street) 
Triq ix-Xabbata (Climber Street) 
Triq ix-Xabbata Gdida
Triq l-10 ta' Ottubru 1942 (10 October 1942 Street) 
Triq l-Ikbiex (Ikbiex Street) 
Triq l-Isqof D.Cocco Palmier (Bishop Cocco Palmier Street) 
Triq Marsilja (Marsilia Street) 
Triq Palazz Palina (Palina Palace Street) 
Triq Paranji (Paranji Street)
Triq Ras in-Newwiela (Ras in-Newwiela Street) 
Triq Skerla (Skerla Street) 
Triq Ta' Bebunaq (Bebunaq Road) 
Triq Ta' Dun Luqa (Dun Luqa Road) 
Triq Ta' Durell (Durell Street) 
Triq Ta' Saguna (Saguna Road) 
Triq Ta' Xamgħan (Xamghan Road)
Triq Ta' Zabbetta (Zabbetta Road) 
Triq Tal-Lewż (Almond Street) 
Triq Vinċenzo Caruana Spiteri (Vincent Caruana Spiteri Street)

Twin towns – sister cities

Sannat is twinned with:
 Pisoniano, Italy
 Le Fousseret, France

References

 
Towns in Malta
Local councils of Malta
Gozo